is a Japanese comedian and impressionist (monomane tarento).

Kintalo is represented with Shochiku Geino. She is left-handed.

Impressions
Ayaka Nishiwaki (Perfume)
Ami Nakashima (Dream and E-girls)
Namie Amuro
Shizuka Arakawa
Angelina Jolie
Antonio Inoki
Rina Ikoma (Nogizaka46)
Satomi Ishihara
Tomomi Itano (AKB48)
Midori Ito
Yōsui Inoue
Aya Ueto
Yuko Oshima (AKB48)
Yoko Ono
Rie Kitahara (NGT48)
Ayame Goriki
Haruna Kojima (AKB48)
Miina Tominaga (as Katsuo Isono in Sazae-san)
Etsuko Kozakura (as Jibanyan in Yo-kai Watch)
Haruka Shimazaki (AKB48)
Aya Sugimoto
Nana Suzuki
Serina
Minami Takahashi (AKB48)
Emi Takei
Mitsu Dan
Taylor Swift
Dewi Sukarno
Yoshimi Tendo
Sumiko Shirakawa (as Hiroshi Nakajima in Sazae-san)
Kana Nishino
Kanna Hashimoto (Rev. from DVL)
Yū Hayami
Kim Hyo-yeon (Girls' Generation)
Atsuko Maeda (AKB48)
Madonna
Minako Inoue (MAX)
Hibari Misora
Momoiro Clover Z
Kanako Momota
Ayaka Sasaki
Momoka Ariyasu
Lady Gaga
Mayu Watanabe (AKB48)

Filmography

TV series
Current

Former appearances

Radio

Stage

Music videos

TV drama

Anime television

Anime films

Events

Magazines

Advertisements

References

External links
 
 

Japanese impressionists (entertainers)
Japanese female dancers
People from Aichi Prefecture
1981 births
Living people